Frederick Trench may refer to:

Frederick Trench (MP for Galway) (1681–1752), Irish MP for Galway County
Frederick Trench (MP for Maryborough), Irish Member of Parliament
Frederick Trench, 1st Baron Ashtown (1755–1840), Irish MP for Portarlington and Maryborough
Frederick Trench, 2nd Baron Ashtown (1804–1880), his nephew, Irish peer
Frederick Trench, 3rd Baron Ashtown (1868–1946), his grandson, Irish peer
Frederick Trench (British Army officer) (c. 1777–1859), British soldier and Tory politician